Ronny is a given name, sometimes a short form (hypocorism) of Ryan. It may refer to:
 Ronny (footballer, born 1986), Brazilian footballer Ronny Heberson Furtado de Araújo
 Ronny (footballer, born 1991), Brazilian footballer Ronieri da Silva Pinto
 Ronny Abraham (born 1951), French President of the International Court of Justice
 Ronny Ackermann (born 1977), German Nordic combined skier
 Ronny Büchel (born 1982), footballer from Liechtenstein
 Ronny Cedeño (born 1983), Venezuelan baseball player, formerly in Major League Baseball
 Ronny Chieng, Malaysian comedian and actor, a senior correspondent on The Daily Show
 Ronny Claes (born 1957), Belgian former racing cyclist
 Daniel Ronald Ronny Cox (born 1938), American actor and singer-songwriter
 Ronny Garbuschewski (born 1986), German footballer
 Ronny Graham (1919–1999), American actor and theater director, composer, lyricist and writer
 Ronny Hafsås (born 1985), Norwegian retired biathlete and cross-country skier
 Ronny Harun (born 1984), Malaysian footballer
 Ronny J (born 1992), American record producer
 Ronny Jiménez (born 1989), Bolivian footballer
 Jean Ronny Johnsen (born 1969), Norwegian former footballer
 Ronny Jordan (1962-2014), British guitarist Robert Simpson 
 Ronny König (born 1983), German footballer
 Ronny Markes (born 1988), Brazilian mixed martial artist
 Ronny Marcos (born 1993), German-born Mozambican footballer
 Ronny Maza (born 1997), Venezuelan footballer
 Ronny Munroe (born 1965), American heavy metal singer
 Ronny Nikol (born 1974), German former footballer
 Ronny Olander (born 1949), Swedish politician
 Ronny Philp (born 1989), Romanian-German footballer
 Ronny Reich (born 1947), Israeli archaeologist
 Ronny Rios (born 1990), American professional boxer
 Sylvio Ronny Rodelin (born 1989), French footballer
 Ronny Rosenthal (born 1963), Israeli former footballer
 Ronny Souto (born 1978), Cape Verdean footballer Walder Alves Souto Amado 
 Ronny Thielemann (born 1973), German football manager and former player
 Ronny Turiaf (born 1983), French former National Basketball Association player
 Ronny Van Holen (born 1959), Belgian former racing cyclist
 Ronny Yu (born 1950), Hong Kong film director, producer and screenwriter
 Ronny Brown, American actress and singer

See also 
 
 Ronnie (given name)
 Roni (given name)
 Rony, given name

Masculine given names
 Ronny Julius Lager (born feb 21 1964), Hedge Fund CEO, Financial firm Wall Street, Country of birth Sweden